Diakopto is a coastal town municipality in Achaea, West Greece, Greece. Since the 2011 local government reforms it is a municipal unit of the Aigialeia municipality. The municipal unit has an area of 103.932 km2. Population 6,429 (2011). The town of Diakopto is situated on the Gulf of Corinth, near the mouth of the Vouraikos river and at the lower end of the Vouraikos Gorge.  The  gauge Diakofto–Kalavryta Railway built in 1885 leads up to the town of Kalavryta passing the Mega Spilaio Monastery at about halfway. Diakopto is on the old Greek National Road 8 (Athens - Corinth - Patras); the new  Greek National Road 8A (also Athens - Corinth - Patras) passes 1 km to the south. Diakopto is located about 40 km east of Patras, and 15 km southeast of Aigio.

Subdivisions
The municipal unit Diakopto is subdivided into the following communities (constituent villages in brackets):
Ano Diakopto (Ano Diakopto, Pounta)
Diakopto (Diakopto, Kalyvitis, Kernitsa, Lofos)
Eliki (Eliki, Kalanteri)
Katholiko
Keryneia (Keryneia, Nea Keryneia)
Mamousia (Mamousia, Derveni, Stavria)
Nikoleika
Rizomylos
Rodia
Trapeza (Trapeza, Paralia Trapezis)
Tripia (Tripia, Metochi, Terpsithea)
Zachloritika

Population

History

In the area there were three ancient Greek cities: Boura, Helike and Keryneia. The area followed the fate of the rest of Achaea. Between 1460 and 1821 the area was ruled by the Ottoman Empire, except a brief period of  Venetian rule between 1687 and 1715. As a result of the Greek War of Independence of 1821 Diakopto became part of the new Greek state. The municipality was created in 1835. The municipality was known as Voura (Βουρά).

Persons

Dionysis Papagiannopoulos (1912–1984) actor

Sporting clubs
Lykoi Diakoptou
Floga Rodias
Iraklis Zachloritikon
Niki Nikoleikon
Athlitikos Omilos Diakoptou (AOD)

See also
List of settlements in Achaea

References

External links
Municipality of Diakopto
Diakopto (municipality) on GTP Travel Pages
Diakopto (town) on GTP Travel Pages

 
Aigialeia
Populated places in Achaea